Saint-Vitte is a commune in the Cher department in the Centre-Val de Loire region of France.

Geography
The commune borders the department of Allier and the A71 autoroute passes through the eastern part of the commune. The small river Boeuf forms most of the commune’s northern border

Population

Sights
 The church of St. Vitte, dating from the sixteenth century.

See also
Communes of the Cher department

References

External links

A photo of Saint-Vitte 
Annuaire Mairie website 
Saint-Vitte on the Quid website 

Communes of Cher (department)